Sonnet 119 is one of 154 sonnets written by the English playwright and poet William Shakespeare. It's a member of the Fair Youth sequence, in which the poet expresses his love towards a young man.

Structure 
Sonnet 119 is an English or Shakespearean sonnet. The English sonnet has three quatrains, followed by a final rhyming couplet. It follows the typical rhyme scheme of the form ABAB CDCD EFEF GG and is composed in iambic pentameter, a type of poetic metre based on five pairs of metrically weak/strong syllabic positions. The 3rd line exemplifies a regular iambic pentameter:

×   /×    /     ×  /    ×    /     ×  / 
Applying fears to hopes and hopes to fears, (119.3)

An unusual number of lines (5, 6, 7, 8, 10, and 12) feature a final extrametrical syllable or feminine ending, as for example:

 /   ×    ×   /    /   ×    ×      /     ×    / (×) 
How have mine eyes out of their spheres been fitted, (119.7)
/ = ictus, a metrically strong syllabic position. × = nonictus. (×) = extrametrical syllable.

Line 7 (above) also features an initial reversal, and potentially a mid-line reversal. Other potential initial reversals occur in lines 6, 8, and 13, while potential mid-line reversals occur in lines 9 and 11.

The meter demands that line 6's "blessèd" is pronounced as two syllables.

Interpretations
Richard Hammond, for the 2002 compilation album, When Love Speaks (EMI)

Notes

References

External links
Analysis of the sonnet

British poems
Sonnets by William Shakespeare